is a Japanese light novel series written by Ichirō Sakaki and illustrated by Namaniku ATK. Twelve volumes of the series have been published by Fujimi Shobo under their Fujimi Fantasia Bunko imprint. It has been adapted into three manga series. An anime adaptation was announced in July 2013 and aired from April 9, 2014, to June 25, 2014. A second season titled Chaika The Coffin Princess: Avenging Battle aired from October 8, 2014, to December 10, 2014.

Plot
Five years ago, the 300-year-long war between the Alliance of Six Nations and the Gaz Empire finally came to an end when Emperor Arthur Gaz was killed by the Eight Heroes. The Empire's lands were then divided by the alliance, who later formed the Council of Six Nations to bring peace and order to the land. In addition, Gaz's remains, which possessed incredible magical energy, was divided up and granted to each of the Eight Heroes, who used their shares for various reasons.

In the present, Toru Acura is an unemployed  who is unable to settle in this peaceful era as there is no demand for his Saboteur skills, and thus he sees no meaning in his life. While out foraging in the forest, Toru encounters Chaika Trabant, a white-haired  who travels with a coffin. After saving her from a man-eating unicorn, Toru, along with his sister Akari, are hired by Chaika to gather the scattered remains of Arthur Gaz. It is revealed that Chaika is the former Emperor's daughter, who managed to escape in the chaos following her father's death and wishes to find her father's remains so that she can give him a proper burial. Over the course of the series, the group faces difficulties while facing against each of the Eight Heroes. Frederika, a shape-shifting dragoon who belonged to one of the heroes, joins their party. Meanwhile, the six nations sends the Kleeman Agency's Gillette Corps to hunt down Chaika to obstruct their quest in order to prevent another war. Other groups led by girls claiming to be Chaika Gaz also pursue them to take the parts.

Characters

Main characters

The protagonist is a Saboteur from the village of Acura. He has dark hair and eyes, but in the anime he has dark blue hair. After the downfall of the Gaz Empire and the return of peace, he has lost his way of life. When introduced, he is jobless and poor, and initially mistaken by Chaika to be a bandit attempting to rob her. However they inadvertently encounter a man-eating Unicorn and they work together to defeat it. He has the power of the mysterious Iron-Blood Form (also Iron-Blood Transformation) that when activated turn his hair red and cause crimson markings to appear on his body. He wields two short sword comblades that have retractable wires at their hilts. While he tries to keep their relationship as client and servant, Toru soon develops feelings for Chaika.

The titular character of the series, Chaika is a young magic-user with silver hair and purple eyes who lugs around a giant coffin. She is the Princess of the Gaz Empire and Arthur Gaz's surviving heir. She's also sensitive about the thickness of her eyebrows. For most of the series, she speaks a broken and disjointed form of the common language. After their close-encounter with the unicorn she hires Toru and his sister Akari to help her gather the remains, but over the course of the series, she also develops feelings for Toru. Her weapon is a Gundo Sniper Rifle, which allows her to cast high-precision spells. She is noted to be the Chaika that most resembles the one that Stephan Hartgen killed who was the girl whom Gaz used as a model for the Chaikas.

Toru's younger sister and a fellow Saboteur. She is tall with black hair styled in a ponytail and dark eyes, but in the anime, she has green hair and blue eyes. Although she calls Toru her brother, she is unrelated to him by blood but they are originally from the same area.,  Akari does not hide the fact that she is in love with Toru and is jealous of any other girl who gets close to him. She also uses the Iron-Blood Transformation; however, her markings do not crisscross like Toru's and are much thinner. Her weapon is a large war hammer with a retractable handle and a spike on one side of the head.

 A dragoon, which are a race of magical armored dragons with the ability to shape-shift. She appears as a blonde haired girl with red eyes, and sometimes a grey cat. She was formerly partnered with Dominica Skoda, a Cavalier who made a pact with her during the war with the Gaz Empire in order to gain fame and riches for Dominica's younger sister, Lucie. However, after the war, Dominica discovered that Lucie had been killed by the villagers she ruled over when she refused to sell their family's land to them. Dominica and Frederika avenged Lucie by killing the villagers responsible, but Dominica soon died, due to having lost the will to live without her sister. Due to the close bond they shared, Frederika has been unable to forget her former master and has taken on Dominica's form and has been living as Dominica. After losing a battle with Toru's group, she takes on the form of Lucie Skoda in honor of her master's sister. She also joins Toru's group on their adventures with a new goal: to engage Toru in a fight to the death, although Toru continually postpones their fight, claiming that he must first accomplish his mission to assemble Emperor Gaz's remains for Chaika. At the end of the Soara arc, she proposes that Toru make a pact with her so that he can become a Dragoon Cavalier. In episode 10 of season 2, Toru finally agreed to the contract and is no longer a Saboteur but a Dragoon Cavalier.

Secondary characters and groups

Chaika Bohdan

, known as Red Chaika, is a silver-haired girl who is very similar in appearance to Chaika Trabant, but wears a red frilled headband, has shorter hair, and a more developed chest. Like Trabant, she speaks in the broken and disjointed form of the common language. Her weapon is a snake blade. While Trabant wishes to collect the remains of her father to give them a proper burial, Bohdan intends to enact revenge upon the Eight Heroes by killing them. After seeing that Toru is a capable fighter, she tries to have him and his sister join her cause, but they turn her down after she reveals she intends to kill the Chaika in their company as she claims there can only be one Chaika Gaz in this world. Another thing she seems to have in common with Trabant is her attraction to Toru.

Bohdan has two companions: 
  has brown hair and wears a metal plate covering his forehead. He fights with a spear. He prefers big-breasted girls.
  is a Wizard with long red-braided hair. She uses a Gundo Sniper Rifle in the anime.

Kleemann Agency
The , or more commonly called Kleemann Agency, is a multinational organization tasked with supporting the postwar reconstruction. The organization also includes a number of small field units such as the Gillette Corps and the Campagna Corps whose duty is the capture of bandits and other criminals.

The head of the Kleemann Agency. The Council of Six Nations do not heed Konrad's warnings that Chaika Gaz is still alive. They consider reports of her continued existence nothing more than a myth. However, after incident involving the Soara floating fortress, the Council begins taking the Chaika issue seriously.

Konrad's assistant. In the anime she has short green hair and wears glasses.

Gillette Corps
A division of the Kleemann Agency who have been tasked with capturing Chaika. In season 2 their task switches to gathering the emperor's remains.

The leader of the Gillette Corps. A cavalier from a noble family, he wishes to stop Chaika Trabant's quest of reclaiming Arthur's remains which he fears might lead to another war. However, after learning of Trabant's reasons for her quest and the lack concrete information about Emperor Gaz from official sources, he starts to have doubts about his mission. When the Floating Fortress Stratus is sent by the Council of Six Nations to destroy the floating fortress Soara, he tries to stop the council forces from attacking, as his comrades Vivi and Zita are still trapped inside the Soara. However, he is supposedly killed when a large magic beam from the Soara strikes the council forces. Later it was revealed that he survives the attack, due to Guy's intervention and now serves as the bodyguard of Stephan Hartgen, one of the Eight Heroes. Under Hartgen's control, he fights Nikolai and Vivi, and during the fight, the latter cuts off his hand, breaking him free of Hartgen's control.

A mercenary and the second-in-command of the Gillette Corps. His hair is shaved in a triangular brown mohawk. After the supposed death of Albéric, Nikolai is promoted to Captain of the Gillette Corps.

An orange-haired assassin who is in love with Albéric. Her weapons are throwing needles. Vivi and Zita were sent inside the floating fortress of Soara after its ruler, Duke Gavarni, rebelled against the Six Nations. She reluctantly forms a temporary alliance with Toru so that both groups can escape the Soara, but upon returning to the Gillette Corps and learning of Albéric's supposed death, Vivi becomes mad with grief. As she screams in anguish, her hair and eyes turn white and purple respectively, revealing Vivi to be another Chaika. According to Guy, Vivi is a "half-Chaika" due to her friends preventing the completion of her transformation.

A green-haired female Wizard with glasses who is good at handling machines and drives April, the Corps magic vehicle. Like Vivi, she too has a crush on Albéric but is willing to support her friend. When she and Vivi were trapped in the Soara, she formed an alliance with Toru and his group, despite Vivi's objections, believing it to be the best chance for both groups to escape.

A male Wizard who can control creatures. He is bald but has markings across his face.

A catboy demihuman and the Corp's spy. During the war, demihumans like Leonardo where created to perform dangerous tasks that humans wouldn't do. Since the war has ended, many humans look down on his race. Because Albéric treats him like an equal, Leonardo has a deep respect for him. He is constantly coming up with theories as to why there are more than one Chaikas; his current theory suggests that are all half sisters whose mothers were the Emperor's many wives.

Soara
Soara is a sky fortress that was knocked down in the war with Gaz. It had since been repaired and was active in the final storyline of the first anime season.
The group attempts to start a war by destroying Cadwell, the capital of the Wiemac kingdom but the plans are foiled by Toru's group and the Gillette Corps.

The youngest son of Duke Gavarni. He has blond hair and blue eyes. A sadistic young man, he enjoys cutting open his victims. He killed his family and used his father's name to obtain one part of Arthur Gaz's remains and secretly took control of the floating fortress, Soara, with the help of Layla and Grato. He is responsible for torturing and killing the women in the village. He later fights Toru only to be critically injured. Before succumbing to his wounds as the Soara sinks to the bottom of a lake, he apologises to Layla for not fulfilling her dream but is glad to be with her.

 A wizard and Ricardo's assistant, he pilots the Soara. A former veteran of the Gaz Empire war, he wishes to reignite the war so he can continue his forbidden experiments. Using his mind control weapon spells, he helps Ricardo and Layla gather the minions they need to control the Soara.

 First appearing as an escaping prisoner, Layla soon reveals to Trabant that she is a Chaika herself, themed in blue. She made use of her knowledge of chemistry and wits to enthrall rich men to do her bidding, until she learned that she and the other Chaikas are just tools used to collect Arthur Gaz's remains. As a result, she abandoned her original mission, and chose to take revenge for being manipulated by plunging the continent into renewed conflict. Along with Ricardo and Grato, she uses Arthur Gaz's left leg and Soara to capture women in the village and using their tormented despairing souls to harvest their memories as fuel for the fortress. After the Soara is knocked down, she tries to kill Trabant, but is distracted by Guy, allowing Trabant to shoot her with her magic rifle. Injured herself, Layla stays behind and comforts a dying Ricardo, choosing to die together with him.

Eight Heroes
The eight warriors who killed Emperor Arthur Gaz and split his body among them. Many of them serve as episodic antagonists in the anime series.

Ruler of the town of Delsorant. Despite coming from a cavalier family, Roberto became a wizard after he injured his sword arm. His Gundo is his mansion and can control objects in it by using Arthur Gaz's left hand as its power source.

A dragoon cavalier and ruler of Ipsom. She has blonde hair and red eyes. She had Arthur Gaz's eyes. Coming from a proud but poor cavalier family, Dominica joined the war hoping to gain titles and riches for herself and her beloved younger sister, Lucie, so that she would have a better life. To increase her chances, she made a pact with the dragoon Fredrika, which blossomed into a very close bond. However, upon her return home after the war, Dominica discovered that Lucie had been murdered by the villagers they ruled who had attempted to force Lucie to sell off the Skoda lands to them. In her grief and anger, Dominica and Fredrika killed all of the villagers responsible for Lucie's death. With her sister dead, Dominica lost the will to live and died. However, unable to forget her master, Fredrika took Dominica's form and pretended to be her. In the anime, Dominica dies from an illness after the war.

A wizard from the Kingdom of Koenigsegg, who kept Arthur Gaz's right leg. After the war, he was betrayed by his best friend and wife and left to die. In anger, Simon created a fog machine fueled by Arthur's leg which causes those affected to see illusions of their loved ones betraying them, so that they will feel the pain he felt. When Toru and his group destroy the machine, they discover that Simon has been dead for a long time. In the anime, Simon is discovered to still be alive but he has gone mad.

The wizard who kept Arthur Gaz's heart and now runs a vineyard and winery. After the war, Claudia involves herself in the wine business and hired out of work soldiers to work her vineyard. Despite having one of Arthur's body parts, Claudia has no interest in it, as it was only given to her as a token that she was one of the eight Heroes. It is noted that she is the only of the Eight Heroes who did not suffer any ill fortune after the war nor was she corrupted by the madness of the remains. She says that she always felt something draw her away from using the remains whenever she thought of it. Claudia is surprisingly friendly to Toru's group, especially to Chaika Trabant, despite being her father's killer, and agree to give them Arthur's heart to them provided that they fight her in a duel. After Chaika wins the duel, Claudia throws a tea party to celebrate and even gives Toru's group clues about Emperor Gaz and the locations of the other Heroes before they continue on their journey. As a wizard, she wields a Gundo shotgun and can cast and fire shorter spells which she later teaches to Chaika.

An archer who lives in a forest who kept Arthur Gaz's right arm. He gives up his remains to Chaika Bohdan's group after they defeat him.

A former halberd wielder who rules a coast town near the ocean who kept Arthur Gaz's ears. After the war he suffered from post-traumatic stress disorder and succumbed to near madness. He maintains a fragile grasp on his sanity by hiring people to perform comedy routines for him. When he sees Chaika his sanity crumbles and he flees with Toru and Akari in pursuit. They corner him and are able to persuade him that they will leave him alone in exchange for the remains in his possession. When Chaika goes to the secret island by herself, Toru and Akari pressure him to provide them a boat.

A Viscount whose remains ended up in Duke Gavanni's possession.

Secret Island Complex

The former assistant director of the Gaz Empire Institute of Magic. During the last days of the war, Arthur Gaz assigned Viktor a special assignment in the event of his death and he was sent to a secret island hidden by magic where he and his staff attempted to mass produced and clone Fayla creatures and demihumans that they could control. Layla learned the horrible truth of her origins when she visited the island. When both White Chaika, Red Chaika and their companions travel to the island to find Arthur's hidden fortune, both girls are captured by Viktor's men. Viktor then tells them the horrible truth; Arthur never had a daughter and all of the girls who claim to be Princess Chaika were actually orphans from the war who were brainwashed into believing they were the princess and were made to look like Princess Chaika as part of Arthur's plan to gather his remains after his death. Viktor then attempts dissect both Chaikas as part of his experiments with Niva Lada, but the Chaikas escape and both of them and their companions fight his clone army. He is killed by the combined efforts of Chaika Trabant and Niva. Before succumbing to his wounds, he realizes Niva was created to help the Chaikas.

Captain of the Island Complex's demi-human guards. Like most of the demi-humans stationed there, he is resentful of his employers due to the way they treat him, but this same resentment also drives him to do his best, so that neither he nor the other demi-humans come to harm.

A demi-human non-combat subordinate at the Island Complex. She has feelings for Kiril and befriends Chaika Trabant.

A living Gundo in the form of a young girl. She has the ability to transform to suit her user and seems to have been created by Izhmash at the Emperor's order to assist the Chaikas in gathering the Emperor's remains. When working with Chaika Trabant, Niva turns into a giant gundo cannon that casts very powerful magic. However in the Principality of Hartgen, she was retrieved by Guy who informs a chagrined Chaika Trabant that acquiring Niva was part of her "mission".

Principality of Hartgen

The King of the Principality of Hartgen and leader of the Eight Heroes who supposedly killed Princess Chaika during the war. He possesses Arthur Gaz's head and bored with the lack of strife that came with the end of the war, he decides to start a new war by assembling strong soldiers and gathering the remains under the guidance of Guy and Black Chaika. However, it is later revealed that he was being manipulated by them for their own ends and he is killed.

Also known as the Purple Chaikas, they are the adopted daughters of Stephan Hartgen and Princesses of the Principality of Hartgen. They are the only Chaika clones who are uninterested in gathering the remains, but are instead content with letting Black Chaika do the work with their father. After Stephan Hartgen's death, they laugh and proclaim that their "real father" had killed their "fake father", and stay with the newly resurrected Arthur Gaz as he launches his plan for a continental war.

Also known as Black Chaika, she is the "eldest daughter" of Stephan Hartgen. She came to Hartgen's castle and manipulated him into thinking that he could become the second "Emperor Gaz" despite herself finding war-mongers to be simply "father's play things". She accomplishes the mission of gathering all of the remains through her manipulations and uses them to revive Arthur Gaz. Afterwards she proclaims herself to be the "Queen Bee Chaika" and that all other Chaikas are only "Worker Bees". She bears the most resemblance to Chaika Trabant.

Toru and Akari's mentor as a saboteur. He is revealed to have been working for Stephan, but with the latter's death he is now unemployed.

Other characters

The Emperor of the Gaz Empire. Arthur was a genius who created new technologies and magic that modernized the continent. Despite this, he was despised and feared by others which led to a 200-year-long war between an alliance of the Six Nations and the Gaz Empire. Due to his magic, Arthur was practically immortal and had lived for around 500 years before he was killed by the Eight Heroes. His body was divided among the Eight Heroes since they produced potent magic. However, the remains affected all who used them implying that they were cursed in some way. In the anime, Arthur Gaz is revealed to have let the Eight Heroes kill him and take his remains so that the magic he created, "Chaika", could revive him. "Chaika" is the general term for a revival magic he created, with each Chaika being programmed to hunt down the remains for different reasons, eat them and effect his revival. The memories of the Chaika clones come from a girl who was taken in by Arthur Gaz, but he claims to not be able to remember her name, though he notes that she resembled Chaika Trabant more than any of the other Chaikas. His plan came to fruition when Black Chaika resurrected him. His teenaged self was the basis for Guy.

A mysterious young man who gives Chaika Trabant information on the whereabouts of Arthur's remains. He has short pink hair and blue eyes. He appears as a hologram and helps Chaika and her companions, yet his goals and ambitions are ambiguous as he also helps their adversaries and all Chaikas in their search for the remains. Toru suspects that he had the Red and White Chaikas converge on the island with the intent that one would destroy the other and take all of the remains but the Head and Torso as well as the "emperor's fortune", Niva Lada. Guy also saved Albéric Gillette by mind controlling the soldiers to dogpile atop of him and so protecting him from the blast that should have killed him in the season 1 finale.
In fact "he" is a multiple hive-minded magical mechanism designed with the purpose of making sure that the remains and Niva Lada make their way to Black Chaika so that she can resurrect their "father", king Arthur Gaz. He is imaged after Arthur Gaz's youthful self roughly in his teenaged years.

A traveling merchant who associated with the Saboteurs of Acura Village. Toru and Akari knew her when they were younger and saw her as a big sister. Jasmine taught Toru to see himself not as a weapon of war but rather as a human who could help make the world better. One night, Jasmine and her caravan, including her parents and husband, were attacked by bandits. A young Toru tried to rescue Jasmine and her newborn baby but he was too late and he found them dying from their wounds. To avenge her death, the villagers of Acura hunted Jasmine's killers then hanged them and desecrated their corpses. Jasmine's teachings and death deeply affected Toru.

Media

Light novels

Manga
Shinta Sakayama launched a manga adaptation of the light novels in Kadokawa Shoten's Monthly Shōnen Ace magazine in 2011, and the series ran until December 2014. The series was licensed in English by Yen Press.

Two other manga have also been published: a four-panel manga Hitsugi no Chaikakka, by Kanikama that in Kadokawa Shoten's 4-Koma Nano Ace magazine in 2011–2013 and then in Monthly Shōnen Ace in 2014, and a series titled Gakuen Chaika! that ran in Kadokawa's Age Premium magazine in 2014.

Volumes

Anime
A two-season anime adaptation was produced by Bones. The first season aired in Japan from April 9, 2014, to June 25, 2014.

The second season titled Chaika The Coffin Princess: Avenging Battle aired from October 8, 2014, to December 10, 2014.

An OVA was bundled with the limited edition of the twelfth and final volume of the original novels, released on March 1, 2015.

The first season has been licensed for digital and home video release by Sentai Filmworks. Sentai licensed the second season in May 2016.

Chaika The Coffin Princess

Chaika The Coffin Princess: Avenging Battle

References

External links
 on Fujimi Shobo 
 

2010 Japanese novels
2010s fantasy novels
2014 Japanese television series endings
Anime and manga based on light novels
Bones (studio)
Fantasy anime and manga
Fujimi Fantasia Bunko
Ichirō Sakaki
Japanese fantasy novels
Kadokawa Dwango franchises
Kadokawa Shoten manga
Light novels
Sentai Filmworks
Shōnen manga
Tokyo MX original programming
Yen Press titles
Yonkoma